Charles Mather Cooke (10 March 1844 – 16 January 1920) was a North Carolina politician who served as Speaker of the North Carolina House of Representatives (1881) and as North Carolina Secretary of State (1895–1897).

Cooke studied at Wake Forest College but did not graduate, and served in the 55th North Carolina Regiment during the American Civil War. After the war, he entered into the practice of law in Louisburg, North Carolina, at first in partnership with future congressman and N.C. Supreme Court justice Joseph J. Davis. Cooke, a Democrat, represented Franklin County in both houses of the state legislature at various times in the 1870s and 1880s. From 1877 to 1878, he was solicitor (prosecuting attorney) for the Sixth District.

Cooke made an unsuccessful run for Congress in 1894, losing to William F. Strowd. He was appointed to the office of Secretary of State by Gov. Elias Carr in 1895 upon the death of Octavius Coke. He was defeated for election to a full term in 1896 by Populist Cyrus Thompson. In 1902, Cooke was elected as a state superior court judge, serving from 1903 until 1915.

His childhood home, Cooke House near Louisburg, North Carolina, was listed on the National Register of Historic Places in 1975.

References

OurCampaigns.com biography
North Carolina Manual of 1913

North Carolina lawyers
Democratic Party North Carolina state senators
North Carolina state court judges
Secretaries of State of North Carolina
1920 deaths
1844 births
Confederate States Army soldiers
People from Louisburg, North Carolina
Speakers of the North Carolina House of Representatives
Democratic Party members of the North Carolina House of Representatives
People of North Carolina in the American Civil War
19th-century American lawyers
19th-century American politicians
20th-century American judges